| budget               = 
| network              = AMC
| picture_format       = 
| audio_format         = 
| first_aired          = 
| last_aired           = 
| related              =  
}}
The American West (formerly titled The West) is a limited-event American television docu-series detailing the history of the Western United States in the period from 1865 to 1890. The series was executively produced by Robert Redford, Stephen David and Laura Michalchyshyn with Sundance Productions and aired for eight episodes on AMC from June 11 to July 30, 2016.

As of June 2021, the series was streaming on Amazon Prime Video in some countries.

Overview
Following the American Civil War, the United States begins developing into the "land of opportunity," despite the danger from cowboys, Native Americans, outlaws and lawmen. The series chronicles the stories of Western legends, such as Jesse James, Billy the Kid, Wyatt Earp, George Armstrong Custer, Crazy Horse and Sitting Bull.

Production
Produced and distributed by Sundance Productions, the series features exclusive interviews with notable names from classic Western films, including Robert Redford, James Caan, Burt Reynolds, Tom Selleck, Kiefer Sutherland, Mark Harmon, and Ed Harris.

The series was to be initially aired on Discovery Channel, but was changed to AMC and retooled in 2014. Production on the series began in August 2015, following AMC's ordering it straight to series.

Filming for the series was predominantly done in West Virginia's Berkeley and Jefferson counties, as well as Prickett's Fort State Park in Marion County.

Cast

Main
David H. Stevens as Jesse James
Derek Chariton as Billy the Kid
Will Strongheart as Crazy Horse
John C. Bailey as General George Custer
Moses Brings Plenty as Sitting Bull
Jonathan C. Stewart as Wyatt Earp

Supporting
Morgan Lund as Ulysses S. Grant
Michael Marunde as William T. Sherman
Eric Rolland as Thomas C. Durant
Joseph Carlson as Frank James
Ric Maddox as Pat Garrett
Hugh Scully as Allen Pinkerton
Nicholas Bialis as Morgan Earp
Sean Brown as Cole Younger

Interview subjects
The series features several interviews from authors, celebrities, historians and political figures.

Mark Lee Gardener – author, Shot All to Hell
David Eisenbach – historian, Columbia University
Kiefer Sutherland – actor, Young Guns
Eric Foner – historian, Columbia University
H.W. Brands – historian, University of Texas at Austin
Danny Glover – actor, Silverado
Walter R. Borneman – author, Iron Horses
Paul Hutton, historian – University of New Mexico
Andrew C. Isenberg – author, Wyatt Earp: A Vigilante Life
Karl Jacoby – historian, Columbia University
Anne Collier – curator, Edmund C. Jaeger Cultural & Natural History Museum
Burt Reynolds – actor, Gunsmoke
Robert Redford – actor, Butch Cassidy and the Sundance Kid
Bill Richardson – former governor of New Mexico
Larry T. Pourier – Oglala Lakota Filmmaker
John McCain – U.S. Senator, Arizona
Kathleen Chamberlain – author, In the Shadow of Billy the Kid
Ann Kirschner – author, Lady at the O.K. Corral
Mark Harmon – actor, Wyatt Earp
Tom Selleck – actor, Quigley Down Under
John Morey – historian
Ed Harris – actor, Appaloosa

Reception
Robert Lloyd of the Los Angeles Times compared the series to others in the genre: "What's fresh in this retelling...is the degree to which it has gone in for re-creation as opposed to documentation, and the fact that it has drafted movie cowboys." He added "it's more dress-up than drama, more reenactment than documentary."

Rob Lowman of the Los Angeles Daily News called the series "more entertainment than insightful." He added "The American West doesn't dig into the ramifications of transformation of the West, preferring to keep skipping through history."

Episodes

Broadcast
Internationally, the series premiered in Australia on History on October 11, 2016.

References

External links

2010s American documentary television series
2016 American television series debuts
2016 American television series endings
AMC (TV channel) original programming
English-language television shows
2010s Western (genre) television series
Television series set in the 1860s
Television series set in the 1870s
Television series set in the 1880s
Television series set in the 1890s
Cultural depictions of Jesse James
Cultural depictions of Billy the Kid
Cultural depictions of Crazy Horse
Cultural depictions of George Armstrong Custer
Cultural depictions of Sitting Bull
Cultural depictions of Wyatt Earp
Cultural depictions of Ulysses S. Grant
Cultural depictions of Pat Garrett
Television shows filmed in West Virginia